The 1911 Washington and Lee Generals football team was an American football team that represented Washington and Lee University during the 1911 college football season as an independent. In their second year under head coach J. W. H. Pollard, the team compiled an overall record of 4–2–2.

Schedule

References

Washington and Lee
Washington and Lee Generals football seasons
Washington and Lee Generals football